The BMW M56 is a 2.5 liter 184 PS (135 kW; 181 bhp) straight-six engine. It is a re-engineered version of the BMW M54B25 engine, manufactured in order to meet SULEV regulations in 4 US states.

Background 
The updated 2.5 liter engine designated M56B25, was produced between 2002 and 2006. It was the first BMW Super Ultra Low Emission Vehicles (SULEV).

The M56B25 power output and vehicle performance was the same as the comparable model equipped with the M54B25 engine (US only). M56 SULEV models listed above were sold in California, New York and Massachusetts as 2003 models and in Vermont starting in 2004 model year.

In addition, these vehicles were certified as partial zero-emissions vehicles (PZEV): The vehicles meet the SULEV tailpipe emission standard, which is approximately 1/5 of the ULEV standard. The vehicles conform to the Zero Evaporative Emissions requirements.

Models 
From 2003 to 2006 - 325iA (E46) sedan, coupe and sport wagon with automatic or a manual transmission.

Market 
Sales of this model started in 2003. The E46 SULEV has only been sold in 4 states in the US: California, New York, Massachusetts and later in 2004 in Vermont.

Specifications 
 HC block in the air intake system:
Hydrocarbon escape via the intake system is prevented due to the use of an additional carbon filter incorporated in the air filter housing and a "closed" throttle valve actuator.

 Fuel system components:
All metal fuel system components (fuel rail, injectors, tank ventilation valve, etc.) are made of stainless steel and are fastened together using coupling type connectors.

 Fuel tank and tank ventilation system:
The fuel tank, tank filler neck and evaporative canister are made of stainless steel. Both the fuel pump and fuel filter are completely sealed inside the gas tank and require a complete replacement of the gas tank if either the fuel pump or filter fail.

 Crankcase ventilation system:
The crankcase ventilation valve is incorporated in the aluminum cylinder head cover.

 System components used to achieve SULEV tailpipe emission requirements:
 Dual down stream catalytic converters
 "Warm up" catalytic converters – high cell density technology
 Upstream oxygen sensors – wide band technology
 Pistons – only 3mm fire land
 VANOS – set to fixed position during start up for improved engine start
 New style fuel injectors–4 hole design (5 bar fuel pressure)

Secondary air system with secondary air mass flow sensor used for improved monitoring of secondary air flow.

In addition SULEV models also incorporate a "Direct Ozone Reduction System". The external heat exchange surfaces of the radiator are coated with a catalyst which reduces the ozone in the ambient air drawn through the radiator.

BMW M56 SULEV Gallery

References

External links

 BMW-Planet.com - M56 engine specifications

M56
Straight-six engines